Fernanda Eliscu (April 24, 1880 – September 27, 1968) was a Romanian-born actress in the United States, in English and Yiddish productions on stage and screen.

Early life
Fernanda Eliscu was born in Iași, Romania (some sources say Bucharest). She moved to the United States as a girl with her parents. She trained at the American Academy of Dramatic Arts, and at Cooper Union.

Career
Early in her acting career, Eliscu was associated with Minnie Maddern Fiske and Maude Adams. On stage, Eliscu acted in The Little Minister, Cyrano de Bergerac (1899), Beau Brummel (1899), Her Majesty (1900), Don Caesar's Return (1901), The Smoldering Flame, Pickpockets, Jacque Duval, Romeo and Juliet (1903), Marta of the Lowlands (1903), The Light from Saint Agnes (1906), Ruth (1907), The Third Degree (1909-1910), The Outsider (1924, 1928), If I Were You (1931), Triplets (1932), Creeping Fire (1935), and Winterset (1936). Her extensive collection of hair ornaments, combs, pins, and clasps, was considered remarkable.

In 1909, the Los Angeles Times theatre critic raved about Eliscu, assuring readers that "If the name of Fernanda Eliscu is not inscribed high in the records of dramatic accomplishment during the next ten years, it will be because either dramatic accomplishment or Fernanda Eliscu has ceased to exist."

Eliscu also appeared in films, including Winterset (1936), Background to Danger (1943), Berlin Express (1948), Harbor of Missing Men (1950), and Charge of the Lancers (1954).

Personal life
Fernanda Eliscu married actor Carl Anthony Pfeil. They had three children before Pfeil died in 1930. Fernanda Eliscu died in 1968, in Los Angeles, California, aged 88 years.

Filmography

References

External links

A photograph of Fernanda Eliscu, circa 1931, in the New York Public Library Digital Collections.

1880 births
1968 deaths
American actresses
Actors from Iași
Romanian emigrants to the United States
American people of Romanian-Jewish descent